Chen Jianqiang is a Chinese entrepreneur, the founder and chairman of Springland International. 
According to Hurun Report's China Rich List 2013, he was the 401st richest person in China, with a net worth of $780 million.

Background
Chen obtained his MBA from China Europe International Business School.

Business
Chen is the founder of Springland International, which operates supermarkets and department stores in China. The company went public in October 2010.

Inclusion in Forbes list
As per Forbes, Chen's wealth was calculated based on public reports filed with the Hong Kong Stock Exchange, but Chen's attorney objected to Chen's inclusion in the Forbes list.

See also
List of Chinese by net worth

References

Living people
Hong Kong businesspeople
Hong Kong billionaires
Year of birth missing (living people)
China Europe International Business School alumni
People from Yixing
Billionaires from Jiangsu
Chinese company founders
Retail company founders
Businesspeople from Wuxi